Playground Entertainment is a television, film and theatre production company with offices in New York and London, founded in 2012 by Sir Colin Callender, former President of HBO Films.

Television
The company has produced over 90 hours of television since inception. Series include the Golden Globe and Emmy nominated miniseries Dancing On The Edge for BBC and Starz, the Golden Globe and Emmy nominated miniseries The White Queen for BBC and Starz and its sequel The White Princess for Starz, the Golden Globe nominated anthology series The Missing for BBC and Starz, Dracula for NBC, Wolf Hall, a Golden Globe and BAFTA-winning six-part miniseries adaptation for BBC and Masterpiece of Hilary Mantel’s Booker prize winning novels Wolf Hall and Bring Up the Bodies, and The Dresser, a television adaptation of Ronald Harwood’s classic play starring Ian McKellen and Anthony Hopkins for BBC and Starz.

In 2017 Playground produced Kenneth Lonergan’s adaptation of Howards End for the BBC and Starz, Heidi Thomas’s adaptation of Little Women for the BBC and Masterpiece, and Richard Eyre’s adaptation of King Lear starring Anthony Hopkins and Emma Thompson for the BBC and Amazon Prime Video.

In 2019, Playground produced Lucy Kirkwood’s TV adaptation of her play Chimerica for Channel 4, Chimerica and The Spanish Princess, a sequel to The White Queen and The White Princess, for Starz.

Playground currently produces the hit adaptation of James Herriot's All Creatures Great and Small for Channel 5 and Masterpiece on PBS, Peter Kosminsky's The Undeclared War starring Simon Pegg, Hannah Khalique-Brown, Adrian Lester and Mark Rylance for Channel 4 and Peacock, and a reimagining of the classic novel Dangerous Liaisons for Starz.

Theater
Playground’s first stage production was Lucky Guy starring Tom Hanks by the late Nora Ephron, which tells the story of tabloid reporter Mike McAlary, winner of a 1998 Pulitzer Prize. It won two Tony Awards and had six nominations. In 2014, Playground produced Harvey Fierstein’s Casa Valentina, which was nominated for four Tony Awards including Best Play, and Hedwig and the Angry Inch starring Neil Patrick Harris, which won four Tony Awards including Best Revival of a Musical. Playground was also involved in the production of Kenneth Branagh’s New York stage debut in Macbeth at the Park Avenue Armory, and a co-producer of Jez Butterworth's The River starring Hugh Jackman.

Recent Broadway productions include Dear Evan Hansen, which won six Tony Awards including Best Musical, and Robert Icke and Duncan Macmillan’s 1984, based on the novel by George Orwell. Recent West End productions include Dreamgirls and The Glass Menagerie, both produced alongside Sonia Friedman Productions.

Alongside Sonia Friedman Productions and Harry Potter Theatrical Productions, Playground is a producer of the two-part stage play Harry Potter and the Cursed Child, an expansion of the Harry Potter franchise, which opened on July 30, 2016 in London's Palace Theatre. In 2017, Harry Potter and the Cursed Child won nine Olivier Awards, the biggest single win ever for one production in the history of the awards.  Harry Potter and the Cursed Child opened on Broadway on April 22, 2018 in the newly renovated Lyric Theatre and was nominated for ten Tony Awards and went on to win six, including Best Play. Harry Potter and the Cursed Child opened in Melbourne’s Princess Theatre in early 2019, in San Francisco’s Curran Theatre in the fall of 2019, in Hamburg’s Mehr! Theatre in 2020, in Toronto's CAA Ed Mirvish Theatre in 2022, and in Tokyo's TBS Akasaka Act Theatre in 2022.

Productions
Television
 Dangerous Liaisons (2022–present)
 The Undeclared War (2022)
 All Creatures Great and Small (2020–present)
 The Spanish Princess (2019–2020)
 Chimerica (2019)
 King Lear (2018)
 Little Women (2017)
 Howards End (2017)
 The White Princess (2017)
 The Missing 2 (2016)
 The Dresser (2015)
 Wolf Hall (2015)
 The Missing (2014)
 Dracula (2013)
 The White Queen (2013)
 Dancing on the Edge (2013)

Theater
 Harry Potter and the Cursed Child (2016–present)
 Dear Evan Hansen (2016–present) Rosmersholm (2019), in the West End
 1984 (2017), on Broadway
 The Glass Menagerie (2017), in the West End
 Dreamgirls (2016–present), in the West End
 The River (2014), on Broadway
 Hedwig and the Angry Inch (2014–2015), on Broadway
 Macbeth (2014), at the Park Avenue Armory in New York
 Casa Valentina (2014), on Broadway
 Lucky Guy'' (2013), on Broadway

References

External links
 

Television production companies of the United States
Film production companies of the United States
Theatre production companies
American companies established in 2012
Mass media companies established in 2012